Romania competed at the 1980 Summer Olympics in Moscow, USSR. 228 competitors, 154 men and 74 women, took part in 135 events in 20 sports.

Medalists

|  style="text-align:left; width:72%; vertical-align:top;"|

| style="text-align:left; width:23%; vertical-align:top;"|

Archery

In its first appearance at the Olympic archery competition, Romania was represented by two men and two women. The best result for the nation was earned by Aurora Chin, at 13th place.

Women's Individual Competition:
Aurora Chin - 2319 pts (→ 13th place)
Terezia Preda - 2195 pts (→ 24th place)

Men's Individual Competition:
Andrei Berki - 2389 pts (→ 15th place)
Mihai Birzu - 2280 pts (→ 25th place)

Athletics

Men's 10,000 metres
 Ilie Floroiu
 Heat — 29:03.1
 Final — 28:16.3 (→ 10th place)

Men's 400 m Hurdles
 Horia Toboc
 Heat — 50.89
 Semifinals — 50.58
 Final — 49.84 (→ 6th place)

Men's 3,000 m Steeplechase
 Vasile Bichea
 Heat — 8:35.4 
 Semifinals — 8:24.3
 Final — 8:23.9 (→ 9th place)

 Paul Copu
 Heat — 8:45.6 
 Semifinals — 8:45.0 (→ did not advance)

 Nicolae Voicu
 Heat — 8:49.0 (→ did not advance)

Men's High Jump
 Adrian Proteasa
 Qualification — 2.21 m
 Final — 2.21 m (→ 7th place)

 Sorin Matei
 Qualification — 2.21 m
 Final — 2.18 m (→ 13th place)

Men's Discus Throw
 Iosif Nagy
 Qualification — 59.34 m (→ did not advance, 14th place)

Women's 800 metres
 Doina Melinte
 Heat — 2:01.9 
 Semifinals — 2:00.8 (→ did not advance)

 Fiţa Lovin
 Heat — 2:00.2 
 Semifinals — 1:59.2 (→ did not advance)

Women's 1,500 metres
 Maricica Puică
 Heat — 4:01.7
 Final — 4:01.3 (→ 7th place)

 Ileana Silai
 Heat — 4:04.7 
 Final — 4:03.0 (→ 8th place)

 Natalia Marasescu
 Heat — 4:05.9
 Final — 4:04.8 (→ 9th place)

Women's High Jump
Cornelia Popa
 Qualification — 1.88 m
 Final — 1.88 m (→ 8th place)

Women's Discus Throw
 Florenţa Ţacu
 Qualification — 60.40 m
 Final — 64.38 m (→ 6th place)

Women's Javelin Throw
 Éva Ráduly-Zörgő
 Qualification — 63.84 m
 Final — 64.08 m (→ 7th place)

Boxing

Men's Light Flyweight (48 kg)
Dumitru Şchiopu
 First Round — Defeated Adel Hammoude (Syria) after knock-out in second round 
 Second Round — Defeated Antti Juntumaa (Finland) on points (4-1) 
 Quarter Finals — Lost to Li Byong-Uk (North Korea) on points (4-1)

Men's Flyweight (51 kg)
Daniel Radu
 First Round — Bye
 Second Round — Defeated Keith Wallace (Great Britain) on points (4-1)
 Quarter Finals — Lost to János Váradi (Hungary) on points (1-4)

Men's Bantamweight (54 kg)
Dumitru Cipere → Bronze Medal
 First Round — Defeated Mario Behrendt (East Germany) on points (5-0)
 Second Round — Defeated Lucky Mutale (Zambia) on points (5-0)
 Third Round — Defeated Ryszard Czerwinski (Poland) on points (5-0)
 Quarter Finals — Defeated Samson Khachatrian (Soviet Union) on points (4-1) 
 Semi Finals — Lost to Bernardo Piñango (Venezuela) on points (2-3)

Men's Featherweight (57 kg)
Titi Cercel
 First Round — Bye
 Second Round — Defeated Róbert Gönczi (Hungary) on points (5-0)
 Third Round — Lost to Adolfo Horta (Cuba) on points (0-5)

Men's Lightweight (60 kg)
Florian Livadaru
 First Round — Defeated Tadesse Haile (Ethiopia) after disqualification in third round
 Second Round — Defeated Sean Doyle (Ireland) after referee stopped contest in first round
 Quarter Finals — Lost to Kazimierz Adach (Poland) after referee stopped contest in third round

Men's Light-Welterweight (63,5 kg)
Simion Cuçov
 First Round — Lost to Serik Konakbaev (Soviet Union) on points (0-5)

Men's Heavyweight (+ 81 kg)
Teodor Pîrjol
 First Round — Lost to Francesco Damiani (Italy) on points (1-4)

Canoeing

Cycling

Two cyclists represented Romania in 1980.

Individual road race
 Mircea Romaşcanu
 Teodor Vasile

Diving

Men's Springboard
Alexandru Adrian Bagiu
 Preliminary Round — 427.35 points (→ 23rd place, did not advance)

Equestrian

Fencing

18 fencers, 13 men and 5 women, represented Romania in 1980.

Men's foil
 Petru Kuki
 Mihai Ţiu
 Tudor Petruş

Men's team foil
 Petru Kuki, Mihai Ţiu, Sorin Roca, Tudor Petruş

Men's épée
 Ioan Popa
 Anton Pongratz
 Octavian Zidaru

Men's team épée
 Ioan Popa, Octavian Zidaru, Anton Pongratz, Costică Bărăgan

Men's sabre
 Cornel Marin
 Ioan Pop
 Marin Mustaţă

Men's team sabre
 Ioan Pop, Marin Mustaţă, Cornel Marin, Ion Pantelimonescu, Alexandru Nilca

Women's foil
 Ecaterina Stahl-Iencic
 Marcela Moldovan-Zsak
 Suzana Ardeleanu

Women's team foil
 Ecaterina Stahl-Iencic, Marcela Moldovan-Zsak, Viorica Ţurcanu, Suzana Ardeleanu, Aurora Dan

Gymnastics

Handball

Men's team competition
Preliminary Round (Group B)
 Defeated Kuwait (32-12)
 Defeated Algeria (26-18)
 Lost to Yugoslavia (21-23)
 Defeated Soviet Union (22-19)
 Defeated Switzerland (18-16)
Classification Match
 Bronze Medal Match: Defeated Hungary (20-18) → Bronze Medal

Team Roster
 Nicolae Munteanu
 Marian Dumitru
 Iosif Boros
 Maricel Voinea
 Vasile Stîngă
 Radu Voina
 Cezar Draganita
 Cornel Durau
 Ştefan Birtalan
 Alexandru Fölker
 Neculai Vasilca
 Lucian Vasilache
 Adrian Cosma
 Claudiu Eugen Ionescu

Judo

Modern pentathlon

Three male pentathletes represented Romania in 1980.

Men's Individual Competition:
Dumitru Spîrlea — 5058 pts, 22nd place
Gyula Galovici — 4,935 pts, 27th place
Cezar Răducanu — 4,397 pts, 41st place

Men's Team Competition:
Spîrlea, Câllovits, and Râducanu — 14,390 pts, 11th place

Rowing

Sailing

Open

Shooting

Open

Swimming

Women's 100 m Breaststroke
Brigitte Prass
 Heats — 1:15.10 (→ did not advance)Women's 400m Individual MedleyIrinel Panulescu
 Heats — 5:07.74 (→ did not advance)

Mariana Paraschiv
 Heats — 5:04.56 (→ did not advance)

Volleyball

Women's Team CompetitionPreliminary Round (Group B) Lost to Bulgaria (1-3)
 Defeated Hungary (3-2)
 Defeated Brazil (3-2)Classification Matches 5th/8th place: Lost to Peru (0-3)
 7th/8th place: Lost to Brazil (0-3) → 8th placeTeam Roster Mariana Ionescu
 Gabriela Coman
 Doina Savoiu
 Victoria Georgescu
 Ileana Dobroschi
 Victoria Banciu
 Irina Petculet
 Crina Georgescu
 Iuliana Enescu
 Ioana Liteanu
 Corina Crivat
 Elena Piron
Men's Team CompetitionPreliminary Round, Group B  Defeated Libya 3-0 (3, 1, 1)
  Lost to Poland 1-3 (9,-12, -13, -13)
  Defeated Brazil 3-1 (-11, 4, 12, 3)
  Defeated Yugoslavia 3-1 (9, -14, 8, 12)Semi-final  Lost to Soviet Union 0-3 (-6, -10, -5)Bronze Medal Match  Defeated Poland 3-1 (10, -9, 13,9) (→  Bronze Medal)Team Roster  Corneliu Oros
  Laurențiu Dumănoiu
  Dan Gîrleanu
  Nicu Stoian
  Sorin Macovei
  Constantin Sterea
  Neculae Pop
  Günther Enescu
  Corneliu Chifu
  Marius Căta-Chițiga
  Florin Mina
  Viorel Manole

Water polo

Men's team competitionPreliminary Round (Group B) Drew with Hungary (6-6)
 Defeated Greece (6-4)
 Lost to Netherlands (3-5)Final Round (Group B) Lost to Italy (3-5)
 Drew with Australia (4-4)
 Defeated Sweden (8-3)
 Defeated Bulgaria (10-6)
 Defeated Greece (11-8) → 9th placeTeam Roster'''
 Doru Spînu
 Vasile Ungureanu
 Dorin Viorel Costras 
 Adrian Nastasiu
 Dinu Popescu
 Claudiu loan Rusu
 Ilie Slâvei
 Liviu Râducanu
 Viorel Rus
 Adrian Schervan
 Florin Slâvei

Weightlifting

Wrestling

References

1980 in Romanian sport
Nations at the 1980 Summer Olympics
1980 Summer Olympics